Black Magic 2  (Cantonese: 勾魂降頭 Pinyin: Gōu Hún Jiàng Tóu ) is a 1976 Hong Kong horror film directed by Ho Meng Hua.  It is a sequel to the 1975 film Black Magic.

Plot 
A martial artist fights against an evil sorcerer who has raised zombies.

Cast 
 Ti Lung
 Lo Lieh
 Liu Hui-Ju
 Lily Li
 Lin Wei-Tu

Release 
Black Magic 2 was released in Hong Kong in 1976 and in the United States in 1982.  The film was distributed in the United States by the now defunct World Northal Corp. and was retitled Revenge of the Zombies.

Reception 
Peter Dendle called it an "intense horror-cult favorite" whose "budget effects and martial arts sequences are more than compensated by sustained energy and brazen creativity."

References

External links 
 
 Black Magic at the Hong Kong Movie DataBase

1976 films
1976 horror films
Hong Kong supernatural horror films
Shaw Brothers Studio films
Hong Kong zombie films
Films directed by Ho Meng Hua
1970s Hong Kong films